The 2008–09 Marquette Golden Eagles men's basketball team represented Marquette University in the 2008–09 NCAA Division I men's basketball season. The head coach was Buzz Williams, who served his first season as head coach, and second with Marquette. The team played its home games at the Bradley Center in Milwaukee, Wisconsin. Key contributors included seniors Dominic James, Jerel McNeal, and Wesley Matthews, and juniors Lazar Hayward, Maurice Acker and Jimmy Butler.

Preseason

Roster

2008–2009 Statistics
Updated as of February 19, 2009.

Schedule and Results

|-
!colspan=12 style=|Non-conference games

|-
!colspan=12 style=|Conference games

|-
!colspan=12 style=|Big East tournament

|-
!colspan=12 style=|NCAA tournament

Rankings

References

Marquette
Marquette Golden Eagles men's basketball seasons
Marquette
Marquette Golden Eagles men's basketball team
Marquette Golden Eagles men's basketball team